Galbi-jjim or braised short ribs is a variety of jjim or Korean steamed dish made with galbi (갈비, short rib). Galbijjim is generally made with beef or pork (돼지, dweji) short ribs. In the latter case, it is called dweji galbijjim (돼지갈비찜).

History
In traditional cuisine, galbijjim was traditionally eaten at Chuseok along with songpyeon, namul, taro soup, chestnut dumplings (밤단자), chicken jjim and autumn fruit. As galbijjim is usually made from only the center part of ribs from a calf while the rib ends used to make soup stock, galbi was more expensive than other cuts of beef in South Korea, and has been regarded as a high-class dish.

Preparation and serving
Ribs are cut to size and excess blood should be removed. Knife cuts are made in the meat till the bone to allow seasoning to seep in. Surplus fat is removed from the ribs, either by cutting or removing after parboiling. Soy sauce, sesame oil, scallions, minced garlic, pepper, ground sesame with salt (깨소금), ginger juice, and sugar are mixed together with the ribs and are simmered in a large pot on a mid-flame. The cooking is done slowly, occasionally stirring. When the meat is almost cooked, additional seasoning is added with jujube,  ginkgo nuts, carrots, and pine nuts, and is boiled once again. Chestnuts, shiitake, and seogi mushrooms are added near the end of the dish.
Galbijjim is usually served in a bowl rather than a plate and was traditionally served in a hap (합, bowl with cover).

Galbijjim by region
There is a galbijjim street in the district of Dongin-dong, Daegu, in South Korea. It is known as the original home of hot and spicy galbijjim (매운갈비찜), as a restaurant owner served the first plate of hot and spicy galbijjim as anju for makgeolli in 1972. The district still maintains its reputation as being the place to go for tasty galbijjim. 

Jong-galbijjim (종갈비찜) is a variety of pork galbijjim from the Gyeonggi-do region. Pork ribs are marinated in ginger juice, soy sauce, minced garlic, sesame oil, ground sesame with salt, and pepper. The dish is cooked on a high flame and the sauce is reduced accordingly.

Gallery

See also
 Jjim
 Galbi
 Jorim
 Korean cuisine
 List of steamed foods

References

External links

 Cooking Video : Kalbi chim at the Embassy of the Republic of Korea
 Baejeob galbijjim recipe  at the Embassy of the Republic of Korea
 Galbijjim recipe
 Galbijjim recipe at AsianSupper

Korean beef dishes
Korean pork dishes
Steamed foods